Tobias Hainyeko constituency is an electoral constituency in Windhoek, the capital of Namibia. It had a population of 45,912 in 2011, up from 34,348 in 2001.  it had 36,530 registered voters.

The constituency was created in 2003 under the name Eastern Hakahana at the recommendation of the Third Delimitation Commission which suggested that the constituency of Hakahana be split. Since then, the suburb of Hakahana falls into two different constituencies. In 2008 the constituency was named after the guerrilla war hero Tobias Hainyeko. The western part of Hakahana is now called Moses ǁGaroëb constituency, after politician Moses ǁGaroëb.

Politics

The 2004 regional election was won by Aloisi Haimbodi of the SWAPO Party with 9,360 votes. Runners-up were Tobias Namundjebo of the Congress of Democrats (CoD, 225 votes), Phillipp Vlermuis of the United Democratic Front (UDF, 221 votes),  Joseph Kasari of the Democratic Turnhalle Alliance (DTA, 157 votes), and Dina Pasile of the Republican Party (RP, 49 votes)

The 2015 regional election were also won by SWAPO whose Christopher Likuwa gained 8,631 votes. Kaptein Erasmus Hendjala of the Rally for Democracy and Progress (RDP) finished distant second with 568 votes. Likuwa was re-elected in the 2020 regional election, albeit by a much smaller margin. He received 4,724 votes, followed by Emrick Nangolo of the Independent Patriots for Change (IPC), an opposition party formed in August 2020, with 2,831 votes.

References

Windhoek
Constituencies of Khomas Region
2003 establishments in Namibia
States and territories established in 2003